This section of the list of former state routes in New York contains all routes numbered between 201 and 300.

References

 201